Catabasis Pharmaceuticals, founded in 2008 and based in Cambridge, Massachusetts, is a clinical-stage biopharmaceutical company. At Catabasis Pharmaceuticals, the company’s mission is to bring hope and life-changing therapies to patients and their families. Their lead program is edasalonexent, an NF-kB inhibitor in development for the treatment of Duchenne muscular dystrophy. 

In Catabasis’s Phase 2 MoveDMD clinical trial and open-label extension, edasalonexent was shown to preserve muscle function as assessed by the North Star Ambulatory Assessment and Timed Function Tests compared with the rate of change during an off-treatment control period. It also showed a significant decrease in CRP, muscle enzymes including CK, and decrease in heart rate to age-normative values .

References

Biopharmaceutical companies
Companies listed on the Nasdaq
Pharmaceutical companies established in 2008
Health care companies based in Massachusetts
Companies based in Cambridge, Massachusetts